Sammy Sullivan (born 22 May 1998) is an American rugby sevens player. She competed for the United States at the 2022 Rugby World Cup Sevens in Cape Town. They lost to France in the bronze medal final and finished fourth overall.

References

Living people
1998 births
Female rugby union players
American female rugby union players
United States international rugby sevens players